Plaza de Sol y Sombra is a bull ring in Lima, Peru.  It is currently used for bull fighting. The stadium holds 10,000 people and was built in 1982. 

Sol y Sombra
Sports venues in Lima